Albatross Bay is a bay on the eastern shores of the Gulf of Carpentaria, Queensland, Australia.

Geography 
The bay is offshore from the localities of Mission River (in both Shire of Cook and Aboriginal Shire of Napranum),  a number of localities in Weipa Town (Rocky Point, Trunding, Nanum, Evans Landing) and Aurukun (in the Shire of Aurukun).

Three rivers flow into the bay:

 Mission River
 Embley River
 Hey River

History 
The bay was named after the Queensland Government's steamer Albatross. The name was chosen either by its master Captain Kerr or by John Douglas when he was the Government Resident at Thursday Island.

References 

Bays of Queensland
Gulf of Carpentaria